Gerry Koning (born 3 January 1980) is a Dutch former professional footballer who played as a right back. He played for FC Volendam, Excelsior, RBC Roosendaal and SC Heerenveen.

External links
 Voetbal International profile 

Living people
1980 births
People from Volendam
Association football fullbacks
Dutch footballers
Excelsior Rotterdam players
RBC Roosendaal players
FC Volendam players
SC Heerenveen players
Eredivisie players
Eerste Divisie players
Footballers from North Holland